The 1936 Tulsa Golden Hurricane football team represented the University of Tulsa during the 1936 college football season. In their first year under head coach Vic Hurt, the Golden Hurricane compiled a 5–2–2 record and won the Missouri Valley Conference co-championship with a 3–0 record against conference opponents. The team defeated Oklahoma A&M (13–0), and Kansas State (10–7), tied Oklahoma (0–0) and Centenary (3–3), and lost to TCU (10–7) and Arkansas (23–13).

Schedule

References

Tulsa
Tulsa Golden Hurricane football seasons
Missouri Valley Conference football champion seasons
Tulsa Golden Hurricane football